David Carson (born September 8, 1955) is an American graphic designer and design director.

Early life and career
Carson was born on September 8, 1955 in Corpus Christi, Texas. He graduated from Rolling Hills High School. He graduated with a bachelor of arts in Sociology.

Carson received the  AIGA medal in 2014.

Bibliography

References

Further reading

External links 
 David Carson Design – official site
 
 TED Talks: David Carson on design, discovery and humor (TED2003)

1955 births
Living people
American graphic designers
American typographers and type designers
AIGA medalists
San Diego State University alumni